The Medway Rivulet is a river of the state of New South Wales in Australia. It is a tributary of the Wingecarribee River.

See also
List of rivers of Australia

References

Rivers of New South Wales